McKinnan Gulch is a valley in Marin County, California, United States.

It contains a small stream which descends the western slope of the Bolinas Ridge and drains into Bolinas Lagoon.

Near the head of the gulch is an ore vein (reported in 1955) containing chalcopyrite, galena, pyrite, and calcite.

References

External links

See also
 List of watercourses in the San Francisco Bay Area

Valleys of Marin County, California
West Marin